Genworth Financial is an S&P 400 insurance company. The firm was founded as The Life Insurance Company of Virginia in 1871. In 1986, Life of Virginia was acquired by Combined Insurance, which became Aon plc in 1987. In 1996, Life of Virginia was sold to GE Capital. In May 2004, Genworth Financial was formed out of various insurance businesses of General Electric in the largest IPO of that year. Genworth Financial is incorporated in Virginia.

Genworth Financial has three segments: Retirement & Protection, US Mortgage Insurance, and International. Products and services include life and long-term care insurance, mortgage insurance, and annuities.

Company history

A.G. McIlwaine was the company's first president. Begun by two dozen Petersburg investors, the Life Insurance Company of Virginia offered its first policies to local customers before expanding to Richmond, Virginia. Under general agent F.W. Chamberlayne, the Richmond Department attracted a large number of new clients. Within the first decade, the client base expanded beyond the South.

As the Life Insurance Company of Virginia grew, the headquarters were moved to Richmond, Virginia. By the turn of the 20th century, the company offered products through different divisions. The "Ordinary Division" of the company offered whole life annuity options and related products, the "Intermediate Division" offered term life products, endowment policies, and limited payment policies, and an industrial division offered inexpensive products.

Colloquially known as "Life of Virginia", the company expanded its portfolio in the 20th century. Beginning with its first annuities business written in 1928, the company grew to include different mortgage insurance, lifestyle protection, and long-term care products and options.

Over the following decades, the company has undergone several major acquisitions, beginning in 1986 when Life of Virginia was acquired by Combined Insurance for $557 million, which became AON Corporation the following year. In 1995, almost a decade after the acquisition, GE Capital, the financial services unit of General Electric, announced its plan to buy most of AON Corporation's life insurance business, including Life of Virginia.

Under GE Capital, Life of Virginia became a part of GE Financial Assurance Holdings, Inc., before becoming GE Capital Assurance Company. The company was incorporated as Genworth Financial, Inc. on October 23, 2003, formed out of several GE Capital insurance companies.  On May 25, 2004, Genworth became a publicly traded company in the largest initial public offering (IPO) of 2004.

GE sold its remaining stake in the company in 2006 for an estimated $2.8 billion. In 2007, another GE Capital insurance company, First Colony Life Insurance Company, merged with Genworth Life and Annuity Assurance Company, one of the entities within Genworth Financial, Inc, also in 2007, Sun Life Financial bought the Employee Benefits Group (EBG) of Genworth Financial, putting Sun Life Financial on the top market for Employee Benefits programs. As of December 31, 2011, Genworth Financial, Inc. had more than 15 million customers in more than 25 countries.

In 2009, Genworth held an IPO for its Canadian subsidiary, Genworth MI Canada, on the Toronto Stock Exchange, raising $850 million.

On April 1, 2013, Genworth announced the completion of a legal entity reorganization, with the result being the creation of a new ultimate holding company. This restructuring separated the U.S. mortgage insurance subsidiaries from the overall firm.

On October 24, 2016, China Oceanwide Holdings Group agreed to buy Genworth Financial Inc. for $2.7 billion. However, on April 6, 2021, Genworth terminated the acquisition due to China Oceanwide's inability to finalize the acquisition.

In May 2020, National Australia Bank has terminated its deal to acquire insurance for homebuyers from Genworth Mortgage Insurance Australia. On June 30, 2020, Genworth Financial, Inc. confirmed that it is going ahead with proposals to resolve its short-term commitments and debt responsibilities, while China Oceanwide Holdings Group Co., Ltd. (Oceanwide) is finalizing the investment strategy for Genworth's takeover.

In July 2020, Genworth Financial, Inc. has confirmed the retirement of Kelly L. Groh as executive vice president and chief financial officer. Succeeding Groh will be Dan Sheehan, executive vice president and chief investment officer of Genworth, but she will stay with Genworth for a period of time in an advisory capacity to insure the transition operates smoothly.

Products and services

Life insurance was the company's first product. As of December 2013, Genworth Life and Annuity Insurance Company and Genworth Life Insurance Company had over $728 billion insurance in force.

Genworth Financial offers a range of products and services, including long-term care insurance and mortgage insurance. The long-term care business provides individual long-term care insurance, group long-term care insurance for employers offering benefits to employees, and caregiver support services.

Prior to 2016, the company offered term life insurance, whole life insurance, universal life insurance, and index universal life insurance, as well as annuities, including fixed immediate annuities, traditional fixed deferred annuities, and fixed index annuities. In 2016, the company suspended sales of annuities and life insurance, putting the existing books of business into runoff.

Securities fraud lawsuits

On April 14, 2014, a class action lawsuit was commenced the United States District Court for the Southern District of New York against Genworth for "disseminating false and misleading statements to the investing public." Another lawsuit was brought in the United States District Court for the Eastern District of Virginia on behalf of investors.  On March 14, 2016, the Alberta Investment Management Corporation and the Fresno County Employees' Retirement Association reached an agreement in principle to recover US$219 million. The lawsuit alleged that Genworth and certain senior executives made false and misleading statements about Genworth's long-term care insurance business and the company's financial statements between October 30, 2013, and November 5, 2014.

Genworth MI Canada 
Genworth MI Canada was the Canadian partially-owned subsidiary of Genworth Financial. It is the largest private-sector residential mortgage insurer in Canada (second largest overall, after the Canadian Mortgage and Housing Corporation). On October 13, 2020, Genworth MI Canada was renamed to Sagen MI Canada. Brookfield Business Partners later purchased all of the outstanding common shares of Sagen that were not already owned by Brookfield at a price of $43.50 in cash per Common Share. Sagen is now a Canadian company, traded at the Toronto Stock Exchange as TSX:MIC.

References

External links
 Genworth Home Page

Companies listed on the New York Stock Exchange
Financial services companies of the United States
Insurance companies of the United States
Financial services companies established in 2004
Former General Electric subsidiaries
Companies based in Richmond, Virginia
Life insurance companies of the United States
Companies based in Stamford, Connecticut
2004 initial public offerings
Corporate spin-offs